Senior Minister of Malaysia was the second and third highest levels of political office in Malaysia from March 2020 to November 2022. Former Prime Minister Muhyiddin Yassin, started the convention of appointing senior ministers into his cabinet. The convention was maintained in the cabinet of his successor, Ismail Sabri Yaakob. His successor Anwar Ibrahim did not follow and instead appointed two Deputy Prime Ministers in his cabinet and abolished the office of Senior Minister. According to Muhyiddin, the office was to deputise for the Prime Minister, similar to the duties of the Deputy Prime Minister. Muhyiddin also named one of the four former Senior Minister Azmin Ali as the Acting Prime Minister during his absence during his term as the Prime Minister. However, during a brief period from 7 July 2021 to 16 August 2021 for 40 days, both offices coexisted. Muhyiddin promoted Ismail Sabri to the Deputy Prime Minister while promoting Hishammuddin Hussein to replace Ismail Sabri as the Senior Minister and retaining all three other Senior Ministers on 7 July 2021, the coexistence ended after the collapse of the Muhyiddin administration on 16 August 2021 as after Ismail Sabri became the Prime Minister, he did not appoint the Deputy Prime Minister and only appointed Senior Ministers.

Appointment and power
The cabinet formed under former Prime Minister Muhyiddin in 2020, following the 2020-2021 Malaysian political crisis, was unique as there were no Members of Parliament (MPs) appointed to the post of the Deputy Prime Minister  in his current cabinet. Instead, he appointed four senior ministers.

These senior ministers will assist the prime minister in carrying out his duties as prime minister including chairing cabinet meetings during his absence. Although the four senior ministers were of equal standings, Azmin Ali was designated by the prime minister to preside over the cabinet's meeting in his absence.

These positions were dissolved following the resignation of the cabinet after they had handed in their resignation to the Yang Di-Pertuan Agong on 16 August 2021.

List of Senior Ministers of Malaysia
Colour key (for political parties):

See also 
 Deputy Prime Minister of Malaysia

Notes

References 

Malaysia politics-related lists
 Senior